Japan–Venezuela relations are foreign relations between Japan and Venezuela.  Formal diplomatic relations between the countries were established in August 1938.  Venezuela broke off diplomatic ties with Japan (and the other Axis Powers) in December 1941, shortly after the Japanese attack on Pearl Harbor.

In 1999, Venezuelan President Hugo Chavez made a three-day trip to Japan.

Japanese banks Marubeni and Mitsui loaned Venezuela $3.5 billion in 2007 to be repaid in oil. The Japan Bank for International Cooperation provided $1.89 billion in loans to support the banks.

Japan imported US$1 bn worth of goods from Venezuela in 2008, mainly aluminium, iron ore and cacao.

Hugo Chavez made another two-day trip in 2009, during which he met Prime Minister Taro Aso. During the trip they agreed to cooperate on oil and gas developments and form a committee to study financing development and exploration. Japan and Venezuela signed a dozen other accords as part of Chavez's visit.

On 23 December 2009, Chavez threatened to expropriate Toyota Motor Corp.'s local assembly plant.

References

External links
Japan-Venezuela Relations from Ministry of Foreign Affairs of Japan
Official website of The Embassy of Venezuela in Japan

See also 

 Foreign relations of Japan
 Foreign relations of Venezuela
 Japanese Venezuelan

 

 
Venezuela 
Bilateral relations of Venezuela